The men's 400 metres hurdles event at the 1959 Pan American Games was held at the Soldier Field in Chicago on 28 and 29 August.

Medalists

Results

Heats

Final

References

Athletics at the 1959 Pan American Games
1959